Vegetable carving is the art of carving vegetables to form beautiful objects, such as flowers or birds.

The origins of vegetable carving

The origins of vegetable carving are disputed: some believe it to have begun in Japan in ancient times, others believe it to have begun in Sukothai, Thailand 700 years ago, while still others believe that vegetable carving originated in the time of the Tang dynasty (AD 618-906) and the Song dynasty (AD 960-1279) in China.

Japan
Japan has also been referred to as the root of the art of fruit and vegetable carving, called Mukimono in Japanese. According to the book "Japanese Garnishes, The Ancient Art of Mukimono", by Yukiko and Bob Haydok, Mukimono's origins began in ancient times when food was served on unglazed clay pottery. These rough platters were covered with a leaf before the food was plated. Artistic chefs realized that the cutting or folding of the leaf in different ways created a more attractive presentation. Mukimono did not become popular until the sixteenth century, the Edo period, when Mukimono gained official recognition. At this time, street artists created clever garnishes upon request. From these beginnings the art has developed into a very important part of every Japanese chef's training.

Thailand
Another popular theory of the history of vegetable and fruits carving is that it originates in Thailand. It started during the Loi Krathong festival in the 14th century. During Loi Krathong, rafts are individually decorated using many objects, including banana leaves and flowers.

In the year 1364, one of King Phra Ruang’s servants, Nang Noppamart, had the desire to create a unique decoration for her raft. Nang carved a flower from a vegetable using a real flower as a pattern. She carved a bird as well and set it beside the flower. Using these carvings, she created a raft that stood out above the rest. King Phra Ruang was impressed by the grace and beauty of the carving and decreed that every woman should learn this new art.

Moreover, in the central Thailand, people usually used banana stalk to decorate a bier. Banana stalks were carved by artists into the form of art that called Thaeng yuak art.

As the centuries passed, enthusiasm for this art waxed and waned. In 1808, King Rama II loved vegetable carving so much so that he wrote poetry about it. However, during the 1932 revolution in Thailand, appreciation for vegetable carving died down. In order to revive interest, it is taught from the age of 11 in primary schools through secondary school in Thailand. Optional courses are also offered in universities throughout Thailand.

Vegetable carving today
Regardless of its origins, vegetable carving is flaunted in many different Asian restaurants, cruises, hotels, and other various places.
In the mid-20th century, the art of vegetable carving began to grow outside Asia. Since then other cultures have slowly come to appreciate the beauty and culture associated with the practice. Today, one can marvel at vegetable carving throughout the world.

The products of vegetable carving are generally flowers or birds; however, the only limit is one’s imagination. The techniques of vegetable carving vary from person to person, as does the final result. Some carvings present more artistic detail, while others have simple, yet beautiful shapes. Vegetable carving is generally used as a garnish, but it can also be used for flower arranging.

See also 

Fruit carving
Pumpkin carving
Thaeng yuak

References

Further reading

External links 

 Vegetable carving - history
 Mukimono
 Fruit Carving

Thai art
Food and drink decorations